Naughty! Naughty! (Chinese: 綽頭狀元) is a 1974 Cantonese-language comedy film directed by Lo Wei. It stars Sam Hui as a young con-man.

The movie features Hui singing lyricist James Wong's song 《一水隔天涯》.

Plot 
Wu Te-chuan, a young man, is penniless and he is a conman. He is about to be thrown out of a Macau hotel, but he gets help from Hsiao Yen, a kind-hearted hotel maid. He had to flee to Hong Kong. In Hong Kong, he helped Hsin, a painter, by convincing him that his paintings will sell if he pretends to be dead. Both Wu and Hsin teamed up and engaged in con games, gambling and sex, but the ring enforcers caught up to them. After Wu falls in love with Hsiao Yen, he wanted to turn his life around.

Cast
 Sam Hui - Wu Te-Chuan
 Nora Miao as Hsiao Yen
 Leung Sing-Bor
 Dean Shek as Auntie Six's husband
 Cheng Gwan-min
 Sai Gwa-Pau
 Szema Wah Lung
 Carter Wong
 Alan Chui Chung-San
 Corey Yuen
 James Tien
 Tony Liu
 Wu Wei

References

External links
 Naughty! Naughty! (1974) at imdb.com
 Naughty! Naughty! (1974) at hkcinemagic.com
 Naughty! Naughty! (1974) at dianying.com

1974 films
1974 comedy films
1970s Cantonese-language films
Films about con artists
Hong Kong comedy films
1970s Hong Kong films